A Palace for Sale (Spanish: Se vende un palacio) is a 1943 Spanish comedy film directed by Ladislao Vajda and starring Roberto Rey, Mary Santamaría and José Nieto. It was the Hungarian-born director's first film in Spain, where he was to settle and become a leading filmmaker.

Cast
 Roberto Rey    
 Mary Santamaría
 José Nieto
 Manolo Morán
 Julia Lajos 
 María Brú  
 Manuel Arbó   
 María Luisa Gerona   
 Fernando Fernán Gómez

References

Bibliography
 D'Lugo, Marvin. Guide to the Cinema of Spain. Greenwood Publishing, 2007.

External links 

1943 films
Spanish comedy films
1942 comedy films
1940s Spanish-language films
Films directed by Ladislao Vajda
Films scored by Jesús García Leoz
Spanish black-and-white films
1940s Spanish films